Eozanclus brevirostris is an extinct relative of the Moorish idol that lived during the late Ypresian epoch of the Eocene in what is now Monte Bolca, northern Italy.  It differs from its living relative by having a much shorter snout.

See also

 Prehistoric fish
 List of prehistoric bony fish

References

Eocene fish
Zanclidae
Fossils of Italy